Barrett Glacier is a glacier draining from the north slopes of the Prince Olav Mountains, about  long, flowing between the Longhorn Spurs and the Gabbro Hills to the Ross Ice Shelf. It was named by the Southern Party of the New Zealand Geological Survey Antarctic Expedition (1963–64) for Peter Barrett, a geologist with that party.

See also
 List of glaciers in the Antarctic
 Glaciology

References 

 

Glaciers of Dufek Coast